Idrottsföreningen Elfsborg, also known simply as IF Elfsborg is a Swedish professional football club based in Borås. The club have participated in 17 editions of the club competitions governed by UEFA, the chief authority for football across Europe.

European record

1960–1980, playing in the UEFA Intertoto Cup and UEFA Cup

Elfsborg's debut in Europe-wide competition came in 1961, after winning their national championship to qualify for the inaugural 1961–62 International Football Cup (later known as the UEFA Intertoto Cup). Elfsborg's first group stage match-up was against Germany's SC Tasmania 1900 Berlin, which Elfsborg won with scores of 2–3 away and 5–2 at home. Their second match-up was against Swiss team FC Basel, which began with a 1–2 loss at home but a 3–6 win in Basel, on a hat-trick by Henry Larsson. The last match-up was against unbeaten Netherlands squad Sparta Rotterdam, with Elfsborg losing 2–5 at home and 4–3 away. Elfsborg finished second in their group, and did not advance to the quarter finals; Larsson's 8 goals were most in the group, ahead of teammate Lars Råberg's 6 goals. Five years later, in 1966, continued Elfsborg adventures in Europe and the UEFA Intertoto Cup. The first opponent stood the German Borussia Neunkirchen for, a match which Elfsborg won both home and away with a total of 4–1. Second match against VSS Kosice became a very different story, they lost 3–0 away and then crushed the opponents with 6–0 at home, after a hat-trick by Roger Carlsson. In the final group stage match against leaders Vorwärts Berlin was lost with 2–0 in both matches which meant that Elfsborg finally ended as third in the group.

Also the following year 1967 played Elfsborg in the UEFA Intertoto Cup where they in the first group stage match met the germans Werder Bremen. The first match ended in a 4–1 loss away, but the second game ended with a draw 2–2 at home. In the second game stood the Polish team Polonia Bytom for, where Elfsborg lost in both matches. But in the last match against the Swiss Grasshopper Club Zürich Elfsborg would take a memorable scalp, when they beat them at home with 5–2 after a hat-trick by Lars Heinemann. The return ended in a 3–1 loss and Elfsborg finished again in third place in the group. 1971 was a bad year out in Europe for Elfsborg, they met the teams Stal Mielec, Tatran Presov and Vejle BK. They lost every game except against the Danish Vejle BK where they won both games with a total of 8–0, and once again Elfsborg ended as third in their group.  The year after 1972  played Elfsborg in the UEFA Cup for the first time against the classic German champions Hertha Berlin in the first round, they lost with 3–1 at Olympic Stadium and with 1–4 at home.

1975 was Elfsborg worst year in European competition and the UEFA Intertoto Cup when they finished last in the group after you have met teams as Banik Ostrava, Celik Zenica and Vitoria Setubal. Elfsborg still managed to win at home against Banik Ostrava with 3–1 at home and a tie against Vitoria Setubal. In 1978, Elfsborg participated once again in the UEFA Intertoto Cup and this year was slightly better than the last in 1975, Elfsborg won with a total of 5–3 against Norwegian Lillestrøm SK, and then a win against former Yugoslav Sloboda Tuzla. But against the big giant Israeli Maccabi Netanya F.C. Elfsborg could not compete with, and lost the first game with 7–1 away but managed with a draw at home, 2–2. In 1978 was Elfsborg in the UEFA Cup for the second time when they stood against the French sovereigns RC Strasbourg. The first meeting won Elfsborg surprisingly with 2–0 at home, but in the returning game they lost with 4–1 in front of 31 000 spectators.

1980–2000, many years outside European football
1980, became Elfsborg best year ever in the UEFA Intertoto Cup when they won their group and became the winner of the tournament. This after they first won against FK Napredak Kruševac with a total of 4–2 and then against Slavia Sofia with a total of 3–1. German VfL Bochum became more difficult when the loss in the first meeting with 2–1 and then changed with a win at home 1–0, this meant that Elfsborg ended up as number one in their group. The following year, 1981, did Elfsborg participate in the UEFA Cup where they faced Scottish St Mirren F.C. The first match ended in a 1–2 loss at home who then followed up with a draw 0–0 in Scotland. 1983 Elfsborg would make their penultimate appearance in the UEFA Intertoto Cup, when they stood against the teams TJ Vitkovice, Trakia Plovdiv and Eintracht Braunschweig. It was a bad adventure where they only managed to win against German Eintracht Braunschweig with 1–0 at home and play a draw against Trakia Plovdiv, this meant that Elfsborg finished as last in their group. Despite the poor performance 1983, they managed to reach the UEFA Cup, 1984, where the opponents was Polish team Widzew Lodz, before 30 000 spectators played Elfsborg a draw away against the Poles, 0–0, also at home playing a heroic game with a draw 2–2 and but the Poles advanced furthermore, after more away goals.

2000–present
It would take almost 20 years before Elfsborg would participate in the European cups again, after the heaviest period in the club's history Elfsborg was now back at the top layer of Allsvenskan and participated in the UEFA Cup in 2001 after they won the national cup. They stood against JK Trans Narva in the first round, where they won with 1–3 away and then also won with 5–0 at home after a hat-trick by Stefan Andreasson. The second round was against one of the Polish giants Legia Warsaw where Elfsborg lost with a total of 10–2. After winning national cup once again, Elfsborg participated in the UEFA Cup in 2004 where the opponents in the first round was Glentoran FC who were beaten with a total of 3–1, in the next round Elfsborg stood against Croatian team NK Dinamo Zagreb, Elfsborg lost the first game away with 2–0 and then played a draw at home 0–0. After winning national championship in 2006 got Elfsborg for the first time participate in the UEFA Champions League. This occurred in 2007 when the first round was against Linfield FC where Elfsborg in the first match played a draw 0–0. To then win at home with 1–0 after a goal by Mathias Svensson. The second round was against Hungarian Debreceni VSC where they won away with 1–0 after a goal by Daniel Mobaeck. They secured promotion to the third round by playing 0–0 at home. The third round was against Spanish giants Valencia CF, where 50 000 spectators at the Mestalla Stadium saw Elfsborg lose with 3–0 after including goal by David Silva. Back at Borås Arena Elfsborg lost again with 2–1 after goals by Daniel Alexandersson and David Villa with Valencia's decisive 2–1 goal.

After the excellent results in the UEFA Champions League became Elfsborg directly qualified for the 2007–08 UEFA Cup group stage where they stood against the teams FC Dinamo Bucuresti, AEK Athens, ACF Fiorentina, FK Mlada Boleslav and Villarreal CF. Elfsborg managed to win against FC Dinamo Bucuresti with 2–1 and a draw against AEK Athens, 1–1. The following year 2008 achieved Elfsborg for the last time winning the UEFA Intertoto Cup by beating teams HB Torshavn with a total of 2–1, Hibernian FC with a total of 4–0 and FK Riga with a total of 1–0. Which meant that they finished as group winners. That same year they also played UEFA Cup last time 2008–09 UEFA Cup when it was against the Irish St Patrick's Athletic F.C. but lost surprisingly with a total of 4–3. In 2009 Elfsborg started for the first time playing in the UEFA Europa League where they in the second round stood against Szombathelyi Haladás as they were defeated with a total of 3–0. In the third round was against Portuguese 2010–11 UEFA Europa League finalists SC Braga, as they surprisingly managed to beat them after a completely heroic win by a total of 4–1. In the final play-off round Elfsborg stood against classic S.S. Lazio where they in the first meeting lost with 3–0 and then again after a heroic effort managed to win with 1–0 after a goal by Denni Avdic.

Also the year after 2010 played Elfsborg in the UEFA Europa League where they stood against FC Iskra-Stal in the second round and won with the total of 3–1. The third round was against FK Teteks from Macedonia, a team that Elfsborg won easily against with a total of 7–1. The play-off round was once again against one of the classic Italian teams against Maradona's old club SSC Napoli. Elfsborg succeeded after a heroic performance by goalkeeper Jesper Christiansen to get away from the Stadio San Paolo with a 1–0 loss. Back at the Borås Arena Elfsborg lost anyway with 2–0 after two goals by Edinson Cavani who got his big breakthrough in this match. In 2011 Elfsborg played in the UEFA Europa League for the third consecutive year, and stood against CS Fola Esch in the first round which they won with a total of 5–1. The second round was against FK Suduva where they won easily with a total of 4–1. But in the third round Elfsborg lost surprisingly against the Norwegian Aalesunds FK with a total of 5–1 and failed to reach the play-offs. The same thing happened the year after in 2012. Even if Elfsborg had a perfect start in the qualification by winning a home game in the first stage against Floriana F.C. with 8–0, the biggest international victory in Elfsborg's history. The away game was just as easy, Elfsborg won with 5–0 and with a total of 13–0. In the second stage were the opponents FC Dacia Chişinău and Elfsborg lost the first game after a weak effort with 1–0. But managed to win easy at Borås Arena with 2–0 and therefore advanced to the third stage. In the third stage it would be a Scandinavian battle, since the opponents were Danish AC Horsens. The first away game ended with a draw, 1–1, after Horsens received a penalty in added time. But in the home they lost 2–3 and as in the previous year, Elfsborg failed to reach the play-offs.

Key

 S = Seasons
 Pld = Played
 W = Games won
 D = Games drawn
 L = Games lost
 GF = Goals for
 GA = Goals against
 GD = Goal difference
 H = Home ground
 A = Away ground
 N = Neutral ground
 Final = Final
 SF = Semi-finals
 QF = Quarter-finals

 Group = Group stage
 PO = Play-off round
 3R = Round 3
 2R = Round 2
 1R = Round 1
 3QR = Third qualification round
 2QR = Second qualification round
 1QR = First qualification round
 QR = Qualification round
 aet = Match determined after extra time
 ag = Match determined by away goals rule
 ap = Match determined by penalty shoot-out
 Agg = Aggregated score
 Ref = Reference

Elfsborg's score is noted first in all of the match results given below.

Overall record

By competition

By opponent club nationality

By club

Club ranking

Matches

UEFA Champions League

UEFA Europa League

UEFA Intertoto Cup

References

IF Elfsborg
IF Elfsborg